Khlong Se is a tambon (subdistrict) of Tham Phannara District, in Nakhon Si Thammarat Province, Thailand. In 2017 it had a population of 4,331 people.

History
The subdistrict was created effective 1 August 1986 by splitting off five administrative villages from Na Kacha. In 1990, it was one of two subdistricts which were split off from Chawang District and formed the new minor district Tham Phannara.

Administration

Central administration
The tambon is divided into eight administrative villages (mubans).

Local administration
The whole area of the subdistrict is covered by the subdistrict administrative organization (SAO) Khlong Se (องค์การบริหารส่วนตำบลคลองเส).

References

External links
Thaitambon.com on Khlong Se

Tambon of Nakhon Si Thammarat Province